Tutallipina (possibly from Aymara tutha moth, llipiña to catch birds with a trap) is a mountain in the Vilcanota mountain range in the Andes of Peru, about  high. It is situated in the Cusco Region, Canchis Province, Checacupe District, and in the Puno Region, Carabaya Province, Corani District. Tutallipina lies southwest of the mountain Otoroncane and Huancane Apacheta and south of Sayrecucho.

References 

Mountains of Cusco Region
Mountains of Puno Region
Mountains of Peru